Sir Richard Stanley Barratt, CBE, QPM (11 August 1928 – 5 May 2013) was Chief Inspector of Constabulary from 1987 to 1990.

Education

Barratt was educated at Saltley Grammar School.

Career

He joined Birmingham City Police in 1949, rising to become Chief Inspector. He was with Cheshire Police from 1965 to 1966 (Superintendent to Chief Superintendent); and with the Manchester Force from 1967 to 1975 (Assistant Chief Constable to Deputy Chief Constable). He was  Chief Constable of South Yorkshire Police from 1975 to 1978 when he joined Her Majesty's Inspectorate of Constabulary.

Reports

Awards
He was awarded the Queen's Police Medal in 1973. He was appointed a Commander of the Order of the British Empire in 1979, and was knighted in 1984.

Private life
In 1952 he married Sarah Elizabeth Hale: they had one son and two daughters.

References

|-

1928 births
2013 deaths
People educated at Saltley Grammar School
British Chief Constables
English recipients of the Queen's Police Medal
Commanders of the Order of the British Empire
Knights Bachelor
Chief Inspectors of Constabulary (England and Wales)
Birmingham City Police